Eric Jerome Dickey (July 7, 1961January 3, 2021) was an American author. He wrote several crime novels involving grifters, ex cons, and assassins, the latter novels having more diverse settings, moving from Los Angeles to the United Kingdom to the West Indies, each having an international cast of characters. Dickey was a  New York Times bestselling novelist.

Early life and education 
Dickey was born in Memphis, Tennessee, on July 7, 1961. He received a Bachelor of Science from Memphis State University in 1983. At Memphis State, Dickey was a member of Alpha Phi Alpha, a fraternity.

In 1983, Dickey moved to Los Angeles to pursue a career in engineering. Dickey was employed in the aerospace industry working at Rockwell International, ASSD division, as a software developer, before deciding that he wanted to pursue acting and stand-up comedy, and began on the local and national comedy circuit.

Literary career 
Dickey authored fifteen novels and his work appeared in a variety of publications, including Essence magazine, USA Today, and the Los Angeles Times. His novels were on the bestseller lists of the "Blackboard", The Wall Street Journal, and The New York Times. Dickey has appeared as a guest on many television shows, including BET's Our Voices and CNN's Sunday Morning Live.

Dickey is the author of the graphic novel Storm, which re-imagines the first meeting between the popular X-Men character Ororo Munroe and T'Challa, king of the fictional land of Wakanda and known as the Black Panther.

He performed stand-up comedy, mostly in Southern California. He opened for Bobby "Blue" Bland at the Rialto in Tacoma, Washington.

His books have been published in French, Polish, and Japanese, and several of his books have had separate printings in Great Britain. He has toured in England, France (where Milk in My Coffee was a French bestseller), and the Caribbean.

Two of his novels, Friends and Lovers and Cheaters were turned into touring plays.

Sister, Sister; Friends and Lovers; Milk in My Coffee; Cheaters; and Liar's Game each reached #1 on the "Blackboard Bestsellers List". Cheaters was named "Blackboard Book of the Year" in 2000. Liar's Game, Thieves' Paradise, The Other Woman, and Genevieve have also given Dickey the added distinction of being nominated for an NAACP Image Award in the category of Outstanding Literary Work in 2001, 2002, 2004, and 2005. In 2013, he received the R.E.A.D. Award on behalf of the National Advancement of Colored People (NAACP).

A 2004 review of Drive Me Crazy in The New York Times by Janet Maslin stated, "Mr. Dickey's characters have enough sultry self-confidence to suggest, at their best, a Prince song on paper."

His final novel, The Son of Mr. Suleman, is scheduled for publication posthumously in April 2021.

Death 
On January 3, 2021, Dickey died of cancer in Los Angeles, California, at the age of 59. His death was confirmed in an official statement from his publisher, Dutton. A New York Times obituary described Dickey as "one of the most successful Black authors of the last quarter-century".

Bibliography

Gideon Series 
 Sleeping with Strangers (2007)
 Waking with Enemies (2007)
 Dying for Revenge (November 2008)
 Resurrecting Midnight (August 2009)
 Finding Gideon (April 2017)

Other works 
 Sister, Sister (1996)
 Friends & Lovers (1997), later adapted as a stage play of the same name by Je'Caryous Johnson in 2004.
 Milk in My Coffee (1998)
 Cappuccino (film screenplay) (1998)
 Cheaters (1999)
 Liar's Game (2000)
 Got to Be Real (2000) - contributing writer
 Mothers & Sons (2000) - contributing writer
 Between Lovers (2001)
 Griots Beneath the Baobab: Tales from Los Angeles (2002) - contributing writer
 Black Silk (2002)
 Thieves' Paradise (2002)
 Gumbo: A Celebration of African American Writing (2002) - contributing writer
 The Other Woman (2003)
 Naughty or Nice (2003)
 Drive Me Crazy (2004)
 Genevieve (2005)
 Voices from the Other Side: Dark Dreams II (2006) - contributing writer
 Chasing Destiny (2006)
 Pleasure (2008)
 Tempted by Trouble (August 2010)
 An Accidental Affair (April 2012)
 The Education of Nia Simone Bijou (February 2013)
 Decadence (April 2013)
 A Wanted Woman (April 2014)
 One Night (April 2015)
 Naughtier than Nice (October 2015)
 The Blackbirds (April 2016)
 Bad Men and Wicked Women (April 2018)
 Before We Were Wicked (April 2019)
 The Business of Lovers (April 2020)
 The Son of Mr. Suleman (April 2021)

Awards 
In the 2007 Glyph Comics Awards, the Fan Award for Best Comic was won by Storm, which was written by Eric Jerome Dickey.

References

External links 
 
 

1961 births
2021 deaths
Writers from Memphis, Tennessee
African-American male comedians
African-American novelists
20th-century American novelists
American male comedians
American male screenwriters
University of Memphis alumni
21st-century American novelists
American male novelists
American erotica writers
American male short story writers
20th-century American short story writers
21st-century American short story writers
20th-century American male writers
21st-century American male writers
20th-century American comedians
21st-century American comedians
Deaths from cancer in California
African-American screenwriters
20th-century African-American writers
21st-century African-American writers
African-American male writers